Gokhan Gokgoz (born 6 January 1993) is a Turkish male volleyball player. He was a part of the Turkey men's national volleyball team from 2015 to 2016. On club level, he plays for Arkas. In early 2017, Gokoz became engaged to his tennis player fiancé, Busra Kayrun.

References

Further reading
Profile at FIVB.org
And León was not needed: Zenit walloped Arkas in first Champions League match
Volleyball World League: Turkish Team
Volleyball: Fıvb Men World League
Player Statistics

Turkish men's volleyball players
Place of birth missing (living people)
1993 births
Living people
Arkas Spor volleyball players
Competitors at the 2018 Mediterranean Games
Mediterranean Games competitors for Turkey
21st-century Turkish people